Ramanathapuram Lok Sabha constituency is one of the 39 Lok Sabha (parliamentary) constituencies in Tamil Nadu, a state in southern India.

Assembly segments

After 2008

Before 2008
Ramanathapuram Lok Sabha constituency is composed of the following assembly segments:
Manamadurai (SC)
Paramakudi (SC)
Ramanathapuram
Kadaladi
Mudukulathur
Aruppukottai

Members of Parliament

Election Results

General Election 2019

General Election 2014

General Election 2009

General Election 2004

See also
 Ramanathapuram
 List of Constituencies of the Lok Sabha

References

External links
 Election Commission of India
https://tamil.thehindu.com/tamilnadu/article26644778.ece
https://www.kamadenu.in/news/Tamilnadu/22614-.html
Ramanathapuram lok sabha  constituency election 2019 date and schedule

Lok Sabha constituencies in Tamil Nadu
Ramanathapuram district